Kirill Alekseevich Safronov (born 26 February 1981) is a Russian former professional ice hockey defenceman.

Playing career 
Safronov was selected in the first round, 19th overall, by the Phoenix Coyotes in the 1999 NHL Entry Draft. Drafted from the Russian Superleague's SKA Saint Petersburg, Safronov made his North American debut with the Quebec Remparts of the Quebec Major Junior Hockey League (QMJHL) in the 1999–2000 season. After one season with the Remparts, he joined the Coyotes' American Hockey League (AHL) affiliate, the Springfield Falcons.

Safronov appeared in one game with the Coyotes during the 2001–02 season before being traded to the Atlanta Thrashers (along with Ruslan Zainullin and a draft pick) in exchange for Darcy Hordichuk and two draft picks. Safronov appeared in two games with the Thrashers in 2001–02, in-between winning the Calder Cup with their AHL affiliate, the Chicago Wolves, and 32 more in 2002–03 season before being traded to the Nashville Predators (along with Simon Gamache) for Ben Simon and Tomáš Klouček.  He spent the remainder of the season with the Predators' AHL affiliate, the Milwaukee Admirals, winning another Calder Cup.

Safronov returned to Russia during the 2004–05 NHL lockout and played there until retiring in 2015.

Awards 
Awarded the Raymond Lagacé Trophy (QMJHL defensive rookie of the year) in 2000.
2x Calder Cup champion (2002, 2004)

Career statistics

Regular season and playoffs

International

References

External links 

1981 births
Amur Khabarovsk players
Atlanta Thrashers players
Chicago Wolves players
HC Khimik Voskresensk players
HC Lada Togliatti players
HC Neftekhimik Nizhnekamsk players
HC Sibir Novosibirsk players
HC Yugra players
HKM Zvolen players
Living people
Lokomotiv Yaroslavl players
Milwaukee Admirals players
National Hockey League first-round draft picks
Phoenix Coyotes players
Quebec Remparts players
SKA Saint Petersburg players
Ice hockey people from Saint Petersburg
Springfield Falcons players
Arizona Coyotes draft picks
Russian ice hockey defencemen
Russian expatriate sportspeople in Switzerland
Russian expatriate sportspeople in the United States
Russian expatriate sportspeople in Slovakia
Russian expatriate ice hockey people
Expatriate ice hockey players in the United States
Expatriate ice hockey players in Slovakia
Expatriate ice hockey players in Switzerland